Perrotta is an Italian surname. Notable people with the surname include:

Cosimo Perrotta (born 1942), Italian academic
Fioravante Perrotta (1931–2012), American jurist
Lucilla Perrotta (born 1975), Italian beach volleyball player
Marco Perrotta (born 1994), Italian footballer
Maria Perrotta (born 1974), Italian classical pianist
Simone Perrotta (born 1977), Italian footballer
Tom Perrotta (born 1961), American writer and screenwriter
Louis A. Perrotta (1900-1985), Italian-American surgeon

Italian-language surnames